Fulminatrix may refer to:
Imma fulminatrix, a species of moth
Legio Fulminatrix, a common, but incorrect name for the Legio XII Fulminata of the Imperial Roman Army